is a railway station in the city of Akita, Akita Prefecture, Japan, operated by Japan Freight Railway Company (JR Freight).

Although this station is basically a freight yard, East Japan Railway Company (JR East) conducts passenger business irregularly for cruise ship passengers calling at the Port of Akita.

Departure and arrival of passenger trains exclusively for cruise passengers 
From the beginning, it was a station that handled only freight, but in 2017, it departed and arrived at this station for cruise liner passengers calling at Port of Akita. It was announced that it would operate a passenger train connecting to Akita Station, and a temporary boarding and alighting tarap would be installed to hold the Akita Kantō on 3–6 August. A total of 5 round-trip trains were tested during the period. Passengers are limited to cruise liners, and it is the first case in Japan to use a freight line to transport cruise ships.

In 2018, JR East obtained a second-class railway business license for a limited period, and prepared a full-scale Platform compatible with 4-car trains. From 18 April, a dedicated Joyful Train vehicle was used to start full-scale operation.

Adjacent stations

History
Akita Port Station opened on 15 October 1919. The station was absorbed into the JR Freight network upon the privatization of JNR on 1 April 1987.

Surrounding area
Port of Akita Nakajima Pier
 Nakajima Pier Ferry Terminal
 Roadside StationAkita port Akita Port Tower Selion (Akita City Port Tower)
 Akita City Northern Citizen Service Center
 Tsuchizaki Minato History Tradition Hall
 Akita Rinko Police Station
 Akita Maritime Japan Coast Guard

See also
List of railway stations in Japan

References

External links

Railway stations in Akita Prefecture
Railway stations in Japan opened in 1919
Buildings and structures in Akita (city)
Stations of Japan Freight Railway Company